The discography of the Gaslight Anthem, an American rock band formed in 2005, consists of five studio albums, two extended plays, and eight singles. The members are Brian Fallon (vocals and guitar), Alex Rosamilia (guitar), Alex Levine (bass), and Benny Horowitz (drums/percussion).

The band's debut album Sink or Swim did not rank on any major music charts, and no singles were garnered. In February 2008 the Gaslight Anthem released the Señor and the Queen EP. The '59 Sound, the band's second album and first for SideOneDummy, was released in August 2008 and debuted at number seventy on the US Billboard 200 and fifty-five on the UK Albums Chart, and went Gold in the UK. Four singles were released, with the title track reaching number one hundred fifteen on the UK Singles Chart. While on tour with Rise Against, Thrice, and Alkaline Trio in early 2009, the band released a live EP Live at Park Ave..

In 2010, the Gaslight Anthem released their third album and last for SideOne Dummy, American Slang. The album reached number sixteen in the US and eighteen in the UK. The album's title track was one of three singles released and had minor success in Canada but failed to chart in the US. Handwritten, the band's fourth album and debut on Mercury Records, was released in 2012 and became the band's biggest charting success to date reaching number 3 in the US, number 2 in the UK. It also produced two singles including the band's highest charting single, "45", which reached number 11 on the Alternative Songs chart in the US and number seven in Canada. That same year, in celebration of Record Store Day, the band released Hold You Up, a limited edition three song EP and a four song EP for the single, Here Comes My Man exclusively in the UK. 2013 saw the release of Singles Collection: 2008-2011, a box set containing the singles and b-sides from their second and third albums, and the band's first DVD, Live in London.

In early 2014 the band released The B-Sides, a collection of studio outtakes, live songs and acoustic songs recorded from 2008-2011 and released their fifth album, Get Hurt on Island Records in August 2014.

The large majority of the band's releases are in vinyl and CD formats, with some exclusively on vinyl.

Albums

Studio albums

Compilation albums

Live albums/DVD

Extended plays

Singles

Other charted songs

Other appearances

Notes

References

Discography
Discographies of American artists
Punk rock discographies